Dave Younghusband (born 4 May 1938) is a former speedway rider from England.

Speedway career 
Younghusband rode in the top tier of British Speedway from 1965-1974, riding for Halifax Dukes and Cradley Heathens. He reached the final of the British Speedway Championship in 1968 and 1971.

References 

1938 births
Living people
British speedway riders
Halifax Dukes riders
Cradley Heathens riders
Middlesbrough Bears riders
Edinburgh Monarchs riders